The Assyrian Muslim Cemetery is a Muslim cemetery in Mountrail County, North Dakota, which was listed on the National Register of Historic Places in 2018. It is the oldest Muslim cemetery in the United States, and was the only Muslim cemetery in North Dakota for 90 years. It is located 1/4 mile south of US 2 on 87th Ave. NW, near Ross.

Mosque
The original mosque at the site was built in 1929 by immigrants from what is now Lebanon and Syria. A modest  replacement mosque was built in 2005, although it was built for historical purposes and is rarely used.

References

Cemeteries on the National Register of Historic Places in North Dakota
National Register of Historic Places in Mountrail County, North Dakota
Properties of religious function on the National Register of Historic Places in North Dakota
Mosques completed in 1929
Mosques completed in 2005
Mosques in North Dakota
Muslim cemeteries
Lebanese-American culture
Syrian-American culture
1929 establishments in North Dakota
2005 establishments in North Dakota